Dr Elizabeth Pace (1866 - 1957) was a Scottish doctor, suffragist and advocate for women's health and women's rights.

Early life and education 
Elizabeth Margaret Pace was born in Brixton in 1866 to Margaret Gibb and Thomas Richard Pace, a leather manufacturer, the eldest of four children. She attended Clapham High School. In 1884, she matriculated in the London School of Medicine for Women. She graduated in 1891. In 1892, she was presented to the chancellor at Burlington House, where she was noted for having an award in obstetrics.

Career
During her career, she worked in a number of institutions, in London, Glasgow and Scotland, including:
 New Hospital for Women
 Gynecology department, Bellahoustoun Dispensary
 Glasgow Lock Hospital
 Victoria Infirmary Dispensary
 Glasgow Women's Private Hospital
 St Margaret's School, Polmont

She was involved in a number of organisations with charitable aims, with a particular focus on women's work and health, many alongside her housemate, and colleague, Dr Alice McLaren. In 1893, she was elected honorary member and medical officer of the Ancient Order of Foresters, a friendly society. She was also associated with the Scottish Women's Benefit Association, and the Glasgow and West of Scotland Co-operation for Trained Nurses. She was a member of the Glasgow Obstetric and Gynecological Society. In 1902, she was involved in founding the Glasgow Women's Private Hospital alongside Alice McLaren. She retired from the hospital in 1908, but "she retained her interest in the hospital and remained on the executive committee."

She lectured on various subjects related to health, in institutions such as John Street public school, with Dr Alice McLaren; Kilmarnock school board, and the Logan and Johnston school of domestic economy in Bridgeton. She had a particular interest in temperance, speaking at a conference on the subject, alongside Sophia Jex-Blake. She also spoke on the importance of exercise for women.

She was a founder member of the Glasgow and West of Scotland Association for Women's Suffrage.

Personal life 
During her time in Glasgow, she shared a house with Dr Alice McLaren at 7 Newton Place. She married Andrew Maitland Ramsay in 1907. She died in St Andrews in 1957.

References 

1866 births
1957 deaths
20th-century women scientists
20th-century Scottish women
20th-century Scottish medical doctors
20th-century women physicians
People associated with Glasgow
People from Brixton
Scottish suffragists
Scottish obstetricians
Scottish surgeons
Scottish women medical doctors
Medical doctors from London
20th-century surgeons